The "Constitution of the Athenians" (Athenaion Politeia), also known as "On the Athenian State", is a short treatise on the government and society of classical Athens. Its date and authorship have been the subject of much dispute.  The treatise discusses the organisation of the Athenian government, focusing particularly on the relationship between Athens' democracy and its status as a naval power.

Authorship
Though the treatise was once attributed to Xenophon, amongst whose works it was preserved, it is now taken not to have been his work.  The author of the work is sometimes referred to as the Old Oligarch – a name first used by Gilbert Murray.  Scholars disagree on the author's political views.  Though most see the work as sincere and the author as genuinely oligarchic, some have seen the work as an intellectual exercise by an author who does not sincerely believe the arguments that he advances.

Many scholars have tried to identify Pseudo-Xenophon with a known historical figure, though these attempts “have not yielded good results”.  One possible author who has been frequently proposed is Critias, who would become one of the Thirty Tyrants in 404.  However, there is little evidence to support this position, and Critias’ philosophy does not seem to match that of the Old Oligarch: for instance, the concept of justice proposed at Constitution 1.2 differs from Critias’ ideas on the subject.

Date
Dates suggested for the Constitution of the Athenians range from as early as 443 to as late as 406 BC.  Most scholars favour a date sometime during the Archidamian War.  A frequently cited terminus ante quem for the work is Brasidas’ expedition in 424; this was suggested by Roscher as having disproved the assertion at §2.5 that land powers could not send expeditionary forces far from home.  However, Harold Mattingly argues that the work could in fact postdate this, as Brasidas' expedition was a drastic exception to the rule that land powers did not mount distant expeditions.  In fact, Mattingly argues, there is evidence that the work was composed later than is usually thought: he argues that the festival of the Hephaistia, mentioned at §3.4, was instituted in 421/0 BC, puts the Constitution after Brasidas' expedition.

Content
After an introduction in which the author lays out his thesis that, though he may dislike the Athenian system of government, he acknowledges that it is well-designed for its own purposes, the Old Oligarch begins to discuss specific aspects of the Athenian system and how they work to advance Athenian democratic interests.

The Constitution of the Athenians focuses on the interdependency between Athens’ naval supremacy and its democracy.  The author discusses three features he considered characteristic of the Athenian democratic system.  These were that the system benefited the common people, that it allowed social vices to be common, and that it was not interested in the pursuit of eunomia (“good order”).

References

Citations

Works cited

External links
 Pseudo-Xenophon, translated by E. G. Marchant

Athenian democracy
5th-century BC works
Ancient Greek pseudepigrapha
Ancient Greek constitutions